John Lyon Burnside III (November 2, 1916 – September 14, 2008) was an American inventor and gay rights activist, known for inventing the teleidoscope, darkfield kaleidoscope, and the Symmetricon. Because he rediscovered the math behind kaleidoscope optics, makers of optically correct kaleidoscopes sold in the United States paid him royalties for decades. Burnside was the life partner of Harry Hay from 1962 until Hay's death in 2002. Burnside was living in San Francisco, at the time of his death on September 14, 2008, from complications of brain cancer.

Early life
An only child born in Seattle, he was raised by his mother after his father abandoned the family; being poor, she periodically placed her son in the care of orphanages. He served briefly in the United States Navy, and settled in Los Angeles in the 1940s.

Gay rights activism
Burnside and Hay formed the Circle of Loving Friends in 1965, a group that promoted gay rights and gay love. In May 1966, the two were part of one of the earliest gay protest actions, a 15-car motorcade through Downtown Los Angeles protesting the military's exclusion of homosexuals. In 1967, the pair appeared as a gay couple on The Joe Pyne Show. Burnside and Hay helped plan the first gay pride parade in Albuquerque, New Mexico in 1977. In 1979, the pair, together with Don Kilhefner and Mitchell L. Walker, founded the Radical Faeries.

Personal life
Burnside married Edith Sinclair in Los Angeles. The pair had no children. Burnside later met Harry Hay in 1963 at One, Inc. The two fell in love and became life partners. Burnside died Sunday, September 14, 2008, at the age of 91. His ashes, mixed with Hay's, were scattered in Nomenus Faerie Sanctuary in Wolf Creek, Oregon.

References

External links

Published obituaries
 Obituary on Los Angeles Times
 Obituary on Bay Area Reporter
 White Crane Blog
 Obituary on San Francisco Bay Times
 Gay City News obit
 Queensland News obit

1916 births
2008 deaths
Deaths from brain cancer in the United States
American LGBT rights activists
Radical Faeries members
People from Seattle
American LGBT military personnel
LGBT people from Washington (state)
20th-century American inventors
20th-century American LGBT people